Roman Gennadyevich Loktionov (born 19 June 1985) is a Russian professional football player. He plays for FC Volgar Astrakhan.

Club career
He made his Russian Football National League debut for FC Volgar-Gazprom Astrakhan on 30 April 2009 in a game against FC Chernomorets Novorossiysk.

External links
 

1985 births
People from Maykop
Sportspeople from Adygea
Living people
Russian footballers
Association football defenders
FC Olimpia Volgograd players
FC Volgar Astrakhan players
FC Tyumen players
Russian First League players
Russian Second League players